The 7th FINA World Junior Swimming Championships, was held in Budapest, Hungary at the Danube Arena from 20 to 25 August 2019. The championships were for girls aged 14–17 and boys age 15–18.

Medal summary

Medal table

Men

 Swimmers who participated in the heats only and received medals.

Women

 Swimmers who participated in the heats only and received medals.

Mixed

 Swimmers who participated in the heats only and received medals.

Participating countries
Swimmers from the following 126 countries competed at the Championships.

References

External links
Official website
Results

FINA World Junior Swimming Championships
World Junior Swimming Championships
ICF Canoe Sprint World Championships
International aquatics competitions hosted by Hungary
International sports competitions in Budapest
FINA World Junior Swimming Championships